Heteronida is a genus of squat lobsters in the family Munididae, containing the following species:
 Heteronida aspinirostris (Khodkina, 1981)
 Heteronida barunae Baba & de Saint Laurent, 1996
 Heteronida clivicola Macpherson & Baba, 2006

References

External links

Squat lobsters